In nuclear science, the decay chain refers to a series of radioactive decays of different radioactive decay products as a sequential series of transformations. It is also known as a "radioactive cascade". Most radioisotopes do not decay directly to a stable state, but rather undergo a series of decays until eventually a stable isotope is reached.

Decay stages are referred to by their relationship to previous or subsequent stages. A parent isotope is one that undergoes decay to form a daughter isotope. One example of this is uranium (atomic number 92) decaying into thorium (atomic number 90). The daughter isotope may be stable or it may decay to form a daughter isotope of its own. The daughter of a daughter isotope is sometimes called a granddaughter isotope.

The time it takes for a single parent atom to decay to an atom of its daughter isotope can vary widely, not only between different parent-daughter pairs, but also randomly between identical pairings of parent and daughter isotopes. The decay of each single atom occurs spontaneously, and the decay of an initial population of identical atoms over time t, follows a decaying exponential distribution, e−λt, where λ is called a decay constant. One of the properties of an isotope is its half-life, the time by which half of an initial number of identical parent radioisotopes have decayed to their daughters, which is inversely related to λ. Half-lives have been determined in laboratories for many radioisotopes (or radionuclides). These can range from nearly instantaneous (less than 10−21 seconds) to more than 1019 years.

The intermediate stages each emit the same amount of radioactivity as the original radioisotope (i.e. there is a one-to-one relationship between the numbers of decays in successive stages) but each stage releases a different quantity of energy. If and when equilibrium is achieved, each successive daughter isotope is present in direct proportion to its half-life; but since its activity is inversely proportional to its half-life, each nuclide in the decay chain finally contributes as many individual transformations as the head of the chain, though not the same energy. For example, uranium-238 is weakly radioactive, but pitchblende, a uranium ore, is 13 times more radioactive than the pure uranium metal because of the radium and other daughter isotopes it contains. Not only are unstable radium isotopes significant radioactivity emitters, but as the next stage in the decay chain they also generate radon, a heavy, inert, naturally occurring radioactive gas. Rock containing thorium and/or uranium (such as some granites) emits radon gas that can accumulate in enclosed places such as basements or underground mines.

The quantity of isotopes in the decay chains at a certain time are calculated with the Bateman equation.

History 
All the elements and isotopes found on Earth, with the exceptions of hydrogen, deuterium, helium, helium-3, and perhaps trace amounts of stable lithium and beryllium isotopes which were created in the Big Bang, were created by the s-process or the r-process in stars or stellar collisions, and for those to be today a part of the Earth, must have been created not later than 4.5 billion years ago. All the elements created more than 4.5 billion years ago are termed primordial, meaning they were generated by the universe's stellar processes. At the time when they were created, those that were unstable began decaying immediately. All the isotopes which have half-lives less than 100 million years have been reduced to % or less of whatever original amounts were created and captured by Earth's accretion; they are of trace quantity today, or have decayed away altogether. There are only two other methods to create isotopes: artificially, inside a man-made (or perhaps a natural) reactor, or through decay of a parent isotopic species, the process known as the decay chain.

Unstable isotopes decay to their daughter products (which may sometimes be even more unstable) at a given rate; eventually, often after a series of decays, a stable isotope is reached: there are about 200 stable isotopes in the universe. In stable isotopes, light elements typically have a lower ratio of neutrons to protons in their nucleus than heavier elements. Light elements such as helium-4 have close to a 1:1 neutron:proton ratio. The heaviest elements such as lead have close to 1.5 neutrons per proton(e.g. 1.536 in lead-208). No nuclide heavier than lead-208 is stable; these heavier elements have to shed mass to achieve stability, most usually as alpha decay. The other common decay method for isotopes with a high neutron to proton ratio (n/p) is beta decay, in which the nuclide changes elemental identity while keeping the same mass and lowering its n/p ratio. For some isotopes with a relatively low n/p ratio, there is an inverse beta decay, by which a proton is transformed into a neutron, thus moving towards a stable isotope; however, since fission almost always produces products which are neutron heavy, positron emission is relatively rare compared to electron emission. There are many relatively short beta decay chains, at least two (a heavy, beta decay and a light, positron decay) for every discrete weight up to around 207 and some beyond, but for the higher mass elements (isotopes heavier than lead) there are only four pathways which encompass all decay chains. This is because there are just two main decay methods: alpha radiation, which reduces the mass by 4 atomic mass units (amu), and beta, which does not change the atomic mass at all (just the atomic number and the p/n ratio). The four paths are termed 4n, 4n + 1, 4n + 2, and 4n + 3; the remainder from dividing the atomic mass by four gives the chain the isotope will use to decay. There are other decay modes, but they invariably occur at a lower probability than alpha or beta decay. (It should not be supposed that these chains have no branches: the diagram below shows a few branches of chains, and in reality there are many more, because there are many more isotopes possible than are shown in the diagram.) For example, the third atom of nihonium-278 synthesised underwent six alpha decays down to mendelevium-254, followed by an electron capture (a form of beta decay) to fermium-254, and then a seventh alpha to californium-250, upon which it would have followed the 4n + 2 chain as given in this article. However, the heaviest superheavy nuclides synthesised do not reach the four decay chains, because they reach a spontaneously fissioning nuclide after a few alpha decays that terminates the chain: this is what happened to the first two atoms of nihonium-278 synthesised, as well as to all heavier nuclides produced.

Three of those chains have a long-lived isotope (or nuclide) near the top; this long-lived isotope is a bottleneck in the process through which the chain flows very slowly, and keeps the chain below them "alive" with flow. The three long-lived nuclides are uranium-238 (half-life=4.5 billion years), uranium-235 (half-life=700 million years) and thorium-232 (half-life=14 billion years). The fourth chain has no such long lasting bottleneck isotope, so almost all of the isotopes in that chain have long since decayed down to very near the stability at the bottom. Near the end of that chain is bismuth-209, which was long thought to be stable. Recently, however, bismuth-209 was found to be unstable with a half-life of 19 billion billion years; it is the last step before stable thallium-205. In the distant past, around the time that the solar system formed, there were more kinds of unstable high-weight isotopes available, and the four chains were longer with isotopes that have since decayed away. Today we have manufactured extinct isotopes, which again take their former places: plutonium-239, the nuclear bomb fuel, as the major example has a half-life of "only" 24,500 years, and decays by alpha emission into uranium-235. In particular, we have through the large-scale production of neptunium-237 successfully resurrected the hitherto extinct fourth chain. The tables below hence start the four decay chains at isotopes of californium with mass numbers from 249 to 252.

Types of decay 
 The four most common modes of radioactive decay are: alpha decay, beta decay, inverse beta decay (considered as both positron emission and electron capture), and isomeric transition.  Of these decay processes, only alpha decay changes the atomic mass number (A) of the nucleus, and always decreases it by four. Because of this, almost any decay will result in a nucleus whose atomic mass number has the same residue mod 4, dividing all nuclides into four chains.  The members of any possible decay chain must be drawn entirely from one of these classes.  All four chains also produce helium-4 as alpha particles are helium-4 nuclei.

Three main decay chains (or families) are observed in nature, commonly called the thorium series, the radium or uranium series, and the actinium series, representing three of these four classes, and ending in three different, stable isotopes of lead. The mass number of every isotope in these chains can be represented as A = 4n, A = 4n + 2, and A = 4n + 3, respectively. The long-lived starting isotopes of these three isotopes, respectively thorium-232, uranium-238, and uranium-235, have existed since the formation of the earth, ignoring the artificial isotopes and their decays created since the 1940s.

Due to the relatively short half-life of its starting isotope neptunium-237 (2.14 million years), the fourth chain, the neptunium series with A = 4n + 1, is already extinct in nature, except for the final rate-limiting step, decay of bismuth-209. Traces of 237Np and its decay products still do occur in nature, however, as a result of neutron capture in uranium ore. The ending isotope of this chain is now known to be thallium-205.

There are also non-transuranic decay chains of unstable isotopes of light elements, for example those of magnesium-28 and chlorine-39. On Earth, most of the starting isotopes of these chains before 1945 were generated by cosmic radiation. Since 1945, the testing and use of nuclear weapons has also released numerous radioactive fission products. Almost all such isotopes decay by either β− or β+ decay modes, changing from one element to another without changing atomic mass. These later daughter products, being closer to stability, generally have longer half-lives until they finally decay into stability.

Actinide alpha decay chains 

In the four tables below, the minor branches of decay (with the branching probability of less than 0.0001%) are omitted. The energy release includes the total kinetic energy of all the emitted particles (electrons, alpha particles, gamma quanta, neutrinos, Auger electrons and X-rays) and the recoil nucleus, assuming that the original nucleus was at rest. The letter 'a' represents a year (from the Latin annus).

In the tables below (except neptunium), the historic names of the naturally occurring nuclides are also given. These names were used at the time when the decay chains were first discovered and investigated. From these historical names one can locate the particular chain to which the nuclide belongs, and replace it with its modern name.

The three naturally-occurring actinide alpha decay chains given below—thorium, uranium/radium (from U-238), and actinium (from U-235)—each ends with its own specific lead isotope (Pb-208, Pb-206, and Pb-207 respectively). All these isotopes are stable and are also present in nature as primordial nuclides, but their excess amounts in comparison with lead-204 (which has only a primordial origin) can be used in the technique of uranium–lead dating to date rocks.

Thorium series 

The 4n chain of Th-232 is commonly called the "thorium series" or "thorium cascade". Beginning with naturally occurring thorium-232, this series includes the following elements:  actinium, bismuth, lead, polonium, radium, radon and thallium.  All are present, at least transiently, in any natural thorium-containing sample, whether metal, compound, or mineral. The series terminates with lead-208.

The total energy released from thorium-232 to lead-208, including the energy lost to neutrinos, is 42.6 MeV.

Neptunium series

The 4n + 1 chain of 237Np is commonly called the "neptunium series" or "neptunium cascade". In this series, only two of the isotopes involved are found naturally in significant quantities, namely the final two: bismuth-209 and thallium-205. Some of the other isotopes have been detected in nature, originating from trace quantities of 237Np produced by the (n,2n) knockout reaction in primordial 238U. A smoke detector containing an americium-241 ionization chamber accumulates a significant amount of neptunium-237 as its americium decays; the following elements are also present in it, at least transiently, as decay products of the neptunium:  actinium, astatine, bismuth, francium, lead, polonium, protactinium, radium, thallium, thorium, and uranium. Since this series was only discovered and studied in 1947–1948, its nuclides do not have historic names. One unique trait of this decay chain is that the noble gas radon is only produced in a rare branch (not shown in the illustration) but not the main decay sequence; thus, radon from this decay chain does not migrate through rock nearly as much as from the other three. Another unique trait of this decay sequence is that it ends in thallium rather than lead. This series terminates with the stable isotope thallium-205.

The total energy released from californium-249 to thallium-205, including the energy lost to neutrinos, is 66.8 MeV.

Uranium series 

The 4n+2 chain of uranium-238 is called the "uranium series" or "radium series". Beginning with naturally occurring uranium-238, this series includes the following elements:  astatine, bismuth, lead, polonium, protactinium, radium, radon, thallium, and thorium.  All are present, at least transiently, in any natural uranium-containing sample, whether metal, compound, or mineral. The series terminates with lead-206.

The total energy released from uranium-238 to lead-206, including the energy lost to neutrinos, is 51.7 MeV.

Actinium series 
The 4n+3 chain of uranium-235 is commonly called the "actinium series" or "actinium cascade". Beginning with the naturally-occurring isotope U-235, this decay series includes the following elements:  actinium, astatine, bismuth, francium, lead, polonium, protactinium, radium, radon, thallium, and thorium. All are present, at least transiently, in any sample containing uranium-235, whether metal, compound, ore, or mineral. This series terminates with the stable isotope lead-207.

The total energy released from uranium-235 to lead-207, including the energy lost to neutrinos, is 46.4 MeV.

See also 
 Nuclear physics
 Radioactive decay
 Valley of stability
 Decay product
 Radioisotopes (radionuclide)
 Radiometric dating

Notes

References

External links 

 Nucleonica nuclear science portal
 Nucleonica's Decay Engine for professional online decay calculations
 EPA – Radioactive Decay
 Government website listing isotopes and decay energies
 National Nuclear Data Center – freely available databases that can be used to check or construct decay chains
  IAEA – Live Chart of Nuclides (with decay chains)
 Decay Chain Finder

Radioactivity